Tuotu (脫兔), (Rabbit in Chinese), like Thunder by Xunlei, is a newly developed software that provides a peer-to-peer file sharing service and download accelerating services. It is gaining popularity in Mainland China and Malaysia and supports BitTorrent, ED2K, KAD, HTTP, FTP, MMS, RTSP file-transfer protocols.

References

External links
Official site of Tuotu
边下边看边播种子 脱兔新版抢先试用
脱兔Tuotu2.1.0.56正式版今日发布
BT+eMule 脱兔下载连接与限制优化心得

Distributed data storage
File sharing software